Bellante is a town and comune in the  province of Teramo, in the Abruzzo region of eastern Italy.

References

Cities and towns in Abruzzo